Hyfrydol (meaning "delightful, agreeable, pleasing, pleasant, beautiful, fair, fine; sweet, melodious") is a Welsh hymn tune that appears in a number of Christian hymnals in various arrangements. Composed by Rowland Prichard, it was originally published in the composer's handbook to the children's songbook Cyfaill y Cantorion ("The Singers' Friend") in 1844. Prichard composed the tune before he was twenty years old.

Metre and arrangement
Hyfrydol has a metre of 8.7.8.7.D (alternating lines of eight and seven syllables, usually in trochaic feet, other examples of which include Blaenwern and Abbots Leigh).

The best-known arrangement is probably that by Ralph Vaughan Williams, which he originally produced for his revision of the English Hymnal; Vaughan Williams also composed some variations on this theme and it plays an important role as the third of his Prelude on Three Welsh Hymn Tunes (1955) for brass band.

In addition to its use as a hymn tune, Hyfrydol has been arranged for brass bands and other instrumental groups.

Settings
Hyfrydol has been used as a setting for William Chatterton Dix's hymn "Alleluia! Sing to Jesus!", Charles Wesley's "Love Divine, All Loves Excelling" and "Come, Thou Long Expected Jesus", Francis Harold Rowley's "I Will Sing the Wondrous Story" (1886), John Wilbur Chapman's "Our Great Savior (Jesus What A Friend of Sinners)" (1910) and Philip Bliss's "I Will Sing of My Redeemer" (1876), the 1948 LDS hymn "In Humility, Our Savior", included in LDS hymnals in multiple languages, the Unitarian-Universalist hymn "Hail the Glorious Golden City", as well as many other hymns from a variety of church traditions.

References

1844 compositions
Hymn tunes
Welsh music